Ronald Manning (1937–April 10, 2012) was a Canadian curler from Toronto.  He was the second on the 1967 Macdonald Brier Champion team, representing Ontario (skipped by Alf Phillips, Jr.). The team later went on to finish third at the World Championships of that year.

Personal life
Manning was married to Linda, and had two children. He died at the Toronto General Hospital in 2012.

References

External links

 Ronald Manning – Curling Canada Stats Archive
 Video:  (YouTube-channel "Curling Canada")

Brier champions
1937 births
Curlers from Toronto
Canadian male curlers
2012 deaths
20th-century Canadian people